Mostafa Mido (Arabic:مصطفى ميدو; born 18 January 1981) is a Qatari football player.

References

Living people
1981 births
Qatari footballers
Qatar SC players
Umm Salal SC players
Al-Gharafa SC players
Al-Markhiya SC players
Qatar Stars League players
Qatari Second Division players
Association football defenders